Admiral  Devendra Kumar Joshi, PVSM, AVSM, YSM, VSM, NM (born 4 July 1954) is the Lieutenant Governor of Andaman and Nicobar Islands and the Vice Chairman of  Islands Development Agency (IDA).
He was an Admiral in the Indian Navy and served as the 21st Chief of Naval Staff of the Indian Navy, having assumed office on 31 August 2012.  He is a specialist in anti-submarine warfare. He resigned on 26 February 2014, taking responsibility for a series of accidents, thus becoming the first Indian Navy Chief to resign.

Admiral Joshi has joined the Uttarakhand War Memorial as one of its patron in May 2020. Subsequently, paying homage to brave sons/daughters of Uttarakhand in security of the nation and furthering the cause of the Uttarakhand War Memorial Trust, he has also contributed all his current and future annuities (for gallantry awards/decorations) towards the trust in July, 2020.

Early life
Devendra Kumar Joshi was born to Hira Ballabh Joshi, an Indian Forest Service Officer and Hansa Joshi on July 4, 1954. After completing his early education in various schools wherever his father was posted, he moved to Hansraj College of the University of Delhi. While studying in Delhi, he was selected into the Executive Branch of the Indian Navy in January 1972 and was subsequently commissioned in 1974.

In an interview with Doordarshan, when asked why he had chosen to join the Navy, he replied, "I think it was the lure of the seas, the pull of the unknown...we belong to the hills. Of the land, the hilly terrains, one had seen enough!" As he also said in the same interview, "from both my father's side and my mother's side, for seven generations nobody had been in the Services. Therefore, they [my parents] had not even thought of the Armed Forces as a career option for me. However, once I had made up my mind, they were fully supportive".

Military career

Joshi graduated from the Indian Naval Academy and was commissioned into the executive branch of the Indian Navy on April 1, 1974. He is also an alumnus of the Naval War College, Newport, Rhode Island, the College of Naval Warfare, Goa, and the National Defence College, New Delhi.

Chief of Naval Staff
Subsequently, Joshi was elevated as the 21st Chief of Naval Staff of the Indian Navy, having assumed office on 31 August 2012.

Admiral Joshi resigned following a fire aboard Kilo-class submarine INS Sindhuratna on 26 February 2014. The Times of India wrote that Admiral D. K. Joshi, who was to serve as the Navy Chief till August 2015, "was a hard taskmaster who always ran tight ships. He was unforgiving as a commanding officer wherever he served, tightening screws wherever he went." Many naval officers felt that he had lived up to his own exacting standards by resigning.

Islands Development Agency 
The Islands Development Agency (IDA) was constituted on 1 June 2017 under the Chairmanship of Home Minister Rajnath Singh, and Admiral D. K. Joshi was designated as its Vice-Chairman, following the Prime Minister Narendra Modi's review meeting on the development of Indian Islands Territories. The major mandate of the Islands Development Agency includes guiding the policies, programmes and formulation of Integrated Master Plans for Comprehensive Development of the Islands. Islands Development Agency, with support of the NITI Aayog, is undertaking the holistic development of the Islands territories of India, while giving due consideration to their unique maritime and territorial bio-diversity.

The first IDA Meeting held on 24 July 2017. IDA has so far met six times since its constitution, with the fourth review meeting held on 30 June 2018, being Chaired by the Hon’ble Prime Minister of India himself. With the re-constitution of Islands Development Agency, the Government of India has been fast-tracking the holistic development its Islands territories.

Lieutenant Governor of Andaman and Nicobar Islands

Joshi took oath on 8 October 2017 as the fourteenth Lieutenant Governor of the Andaman and Nicobar Islands, a territory which is the largest archipelago system in the Bay of Bengal, composed of 836 islands, islets and rocks. He concurrently remains designated as Vice-Chairman Islands Development Agency also.

Awards

References

|-

|-

Chiefs of the Naval Staff (India)
Living people
Military personnel from Uttarakhand
Indian Navy admirals
Naval War College alumni
1954 births
Recipients of the Param Vishisht Seva Medal
People from Almora
Lieutenant governors of the Andaman and Nicobar Islands
National Defence College, India alumni
Commanders-in-Chief, Andaman and Nicobar Command
Recipients of the Ati Vishisht Seva Medal
Recipients of the Yudh Seva Medal
Recipients of the Vishisht Seva Medal
Recipients of the Nau Sena Medal
Naval War College, Goa alumni